Tatjana Josipović (born 14 May 1962) is a Croatian jurist and professor at the Faculty of Law of the University of Zagreb, who is the wife of Ivo Josipović, the President of Croatia from 2010 to 2015.

Biography
Tatjana Klepac was born on May 14, 1962 in Zagreb, SFR Yugoslavia (now Croatia). 

She earned her bachelor's degree from the Faculty of Law of Zagreb University in May 1985 and passed the judiciary exam in 1987. In 1990 she earned her master's degree from Zagreb University and a doctorate in 1996.

Personal life
She is married to former Croatian President Ivo Josipović, who is also a jurist and a fellow professor at the Faculty of Law of Zagreb University, as well as a musician  and composer. They have a daughter named Lana (b. 1990).

References

External links

1962 births
Living people
Lawyers from Zagreb
Spouses of presidents of Croatia
Croatian lawyers
Croatian jurists
Croatian women academics
Academic staff of the University of Zagreb
Faculty of Law, University of Zagreb alumni
20th-century Croatian women
21st-century Croatian women